Diaphractus is a genus of African ground spiders that was first described by William Frederick Purcell in 1907.  it contains only three species: D. assimilis, D. leipoldti, and D. muticus.

References

Araneomorphae genera
Gnaphosidae
Spiders of Africa
Taxa named by William Frederick Purcell